Inside Science is a science programme broadcast on BBC Radio Four. It is normally broadcast from 4:30 to 5 p.m. on Thursday, and is repeated 9 to 9:30 p.m. on Thursday. It is normally presented by Adam Rutherford, but may occasionally be presented by a different presenter, such as Gareth Mitchell or Marnie Chesterton.  Any branch of science, physics, chemistry or biology, may be discussed on the programme. The programme normally features the presenter interviewing several people who are specialists in different areas of science. On occasions, topics connected with the history of science may feature in the programme, as on 16 November 2017, when the work of Sir Francis Galton was discussed. The programme normally deals with several areas of science, but may occasionally be dedicated to one field of science, as on 5 April 2018, when a whole programme was dedicated to the work of Stephen Hawking. Similarly, on 25 June 2020 a whole programme was dedicated to the Human Genome Project. The programme is produced by Fiona Roberts and Beth Eastwood. On 18 February 2021, when the programme was presented by Victoria Gill, the first part of the programme dealt with the planned landing of the Perseverance Rover on Mars.

See also
Science in Action, radio programme on the BBC World Service
Material World, BBC Radio 4 science programme which was replaced by Inside Science

References

BBC Radio 4 programmes
Educational broadcasting in the United Kingdom